The 2001–02 Columbus Blue Jackets season was the Blue Jackets' second season in the National Hockey League (NHL), as the team was coming off a 28–39–9–6 record in their expansion season, earning 71 points and missing the 2001 Stanley Cup playoffs. The Blue Jackets did not qualify for the 2002 playoffs.

Regular season
Columbus would get off to a poor start, winning only one out of 13 games to open the season and falling to last place in the Western Conference. While the Blue Jackets would play better as the season progressed, they were far off from playoff qualification and would eventually trade team captain Lyle Odelein to the Chicago Blackhawks in exchange for defenseman Jaroslav Spacek at the trade deadline. Columbus would finish the season with a 22–47–8–5 record, earning 57 points, which was 14 fewer points than in their previous season, and 37 points behind the Vancouver Canucks for the eighth final playoff spot in the West. Columbus would score an NHL-low 164 goals, and their 255 goals against was the highest total in the Western Conference, third-highest in the NHL.  The 57 points the Jackets earned was the second fewest in the League, only ahead of the Atlanta Thrashers, who finished with 54.

Ray Whitney would lead Columbus offensively, scoring a team-high 21 goals and 40 assists for 61 points, which broke the team record for points in a season. Mike Sillinger would be the only other Blue Jacket to score 20 goals, scoring 20 and adding 23 assists for 43 points. Deron Quint led the Jackets defense, earning 25 points, while Rostislav Klesla scored eight goals and earned 16 points in his first full season in the League. Jody Shelley had a team-high and club-record 206 penalty minutes in only 52 games.

In goal, Ron Tugnutt and Marc Denis would split time, with Tugnutt winning a team-high 12 games and posting a team-best 2.85 goals against average (GAA).

Tragedy struck at Nationwide Arena during a game on March 16, 2002, against the Calgary Flames, when a shot by Jackets forward Espen Knutsen was deflected off the stick of Flames defenceman Derek Morris and sailed into the stands, hitting 13-year-old Brittanie Cecil in the head. Cecil would pass away on March 18 due to the injury.

The Blue Jackets would finish the season 30th in the League in scoring, with 164 goals for, and would be shut out an NHL-high 11 times.

Season standings

Schedule and results

|- align="center" 
| 1 || October 4 || St. Louis Blues || 3–3 || Columbus Blue Jackets || 0–0–1–0 || 1 || 
|- align="center" 
| 2 || October 6 || Columbus Blue Jackets || 3–3 || Philadelphia Flyers || 0–0–2–0 || 2 || 
|- align="center" 
| 3 || October 8 || Philadelphia Flyers || 2–2 || Columbus Blue Jackets || 0–0–3–0 || 3 || 
|- align="center" bgcolor="#ffbbbb"
| 4 || October 12 || Montreal Canadiens || 3–1 || Columbus Blue Jackets || 0–1–3–0 || 3 || 
|- align="center" 
| 5 || October 14 || Columbus Blue Jackets || 2–2 || Chicago Blackhawks || 0–1–4–0 || 4 || 
|- align="center" bgcolor="#ffbbbb"
| 6 || October 16 || Columbus Blue Jackets || 3–4 || Detroit Red Wings || 0–2–4–0 || 4 || 
|- align="center" bgcolor="#bbffbb"
| 7 || October 19 || Columbus Blue Jackets || 3–1 || Buffalo Sabres || 1–2–4–0 || 6 || 
|- align="center" bgcolor="#ffbbbb"
| 8 || October 20 || Colorado Avalanche || 5–0 || Columbus Blue Jackets || 1–3–4–0 || 6 || 
|- align="center" bgcolor="#ffbbbb"
| 9 || October 23 || Los Angeles Kings || 7–1 || Columbus Blue Jackets || 1–4–4–0 || 6 || 
|- align="center" bgcolor="#ffbbbb"
|10 || October 25 || Edmonton Oilers || 5–2 || Columbus Blue Jackets || 1–5–4–0 || 6 || 
|- align="center" bgcolor="#ffbbbb"
|11 || October 27 || Columbus Blue Jackets || 0–2 || San Jose Sharks || 1–6–4–0 || 6 || 
|- align="center" bgcolor="#ffbbbb"
|12 || October 30 || Columbus Blue Jackets || 1–3 || Vancouver Canucks || 1–7–4–0 || 6 || 
|-

|- align="center" bgcolor="#ffbbbb"
|13 || November 1 || Columbus Blue Jackets || 1–2 || Calgary Flames || 1–8–4–0 || 6 || 
|- align="center" bgcolor="#bbffbb"
|14 || November 2 || Columbus Blue Jackets || 2–1 || Edmonton Oilers || 2–8–4–0 || 8 || 
|- align="center" bgcolor="#ffbbbb"
|15 || November 6 || Vancouver Canucks || 3–2 || Columbus Blue Jackets || 2–9–4–0 || 8 || 
|- align="center" bgcolor="#ffbbbb"
|16 || November 9 || Edmonton Oilers || 3–0 || Columbus Blue Jackets || 2–10–4–0 || 8 || 
|- align="center" bgcolor="#bbffbb"
|17 || November 10 || Columbus Blue Jackets || 5–1 || Boston Bruins || 3–10–4–0 || 10 || 
|- align="center" bgcolor="#bbffbb"
|18 || November 13 || St. Louis Blues || 2–3 || Columbus Blue Jackets || 4–10–4–0 || 12 || 
|- align="center" bgcolor="#bbffbb"
|19 || November 16 || Mighty Ducks of Anaheim || 2–3 || Columbus Blue Jackets || 5–10–4–0 || 14 || 
|- align="center" bgcolor="#ffbbbb"
|20 || November 17 || Columbus Blue Jackets || 2–3 || Nashville Predators || 5–11–4–0 || 14 || 
|- align="center" bgcolor="#ffbbbb"
|21 || November 19 || Columbus Blue Jackets || 2–5 || Carolina Hurricanes || 5–12–4–0 || 14 || 
|- align="center" bgcolor="#ffffbb"
|22 || November 21 || Detroit Red Wings || 1–0 || Columbus Blue Jackets || 5–12–4–1 || 15 || 
|- align="center" 
|23 || November 23 || Chicago Blackhawks || 2–2 || Columbus Blue Jackets || 5–12–5–1 || 16 || 
|- align="center" bgcolor="#bbffbb"
|24 || November 25 || Calgary Flames || 3–4 || Columbus Blue Jackets || 6–12–5–1 || 18 || 
|- align="center" bgcolor="#bbffbb"
|25 || November 27 || Phoenix Coyotes || 0–3 || Columbus Blue Jackets || 7–12–5–1 || 20 || 
|- align="center" bgcolor="#ffbbbb"
|26 || November 29 || St. Louis Blues || 3–1 || Columbus Blue Jackets || 7–13–5–1 || 20 || 
|-

|- align="center" bgcolor="#ffbbbb"
|27 || December 1 || Columbus Blue Jackets || 3–4 || St. Louis Blues || 7–14–5–1 || 20 || 
|- align="center" bgcolor="#ffbbbb"
|28 || December 5 || Columbus Blue Jackets || 0–2 || Florida Panthers || 7–15–5–1 || 20 || 
|- align="center" bgcolor="#ffbbbb"
|29 || December 6 || Columbus Blue Jackets || 0–1 || Tampa Bay Lightning || 7–16–5–1 || 20 || 
|- align="center" bgcolor="#ffbbbb"
|30 || December 8 || Colorado Avalanche || 2–0 || Columbus Blue Jackets || 7–17–5–1 || 20 || 
|- align="center" bgcolor="#bbffbb"
|31 || December 10 || New Jersey Devils || 1–3 || Columbus Blue Jackets || 8–17–5–1 || 22 || 
|- align="center" bgcolor="#ffbbbb"
|32 || December 12 || Columbus Blue Jackets || 1–5 || Colorado Avalanche || 8–18–5–1 || 22 || 
|- align="center" bgcolor="#bbffbb"
|33 || December 14 || Columbus Blue Jackets || 3–2 || Mighty Ducks of Anaheim || 9–18–5–1 || 24 || 
|- align="center" bgcolor="#ffbbbb"
|34 || December 15 || Columbus Blue Jackets || 2–3 || Los Angeles Kings || 9–19–5–1 || 24 || 
|- align="center" bgcolor="#ffbbbb"
|35 || December 17 || Columbus Blue Jackets || 1–4 || Phoenix Coyotes || 9–20–5–1 || 24 || 
|- align="center" bgcolor="#ffbbbb"
|36 || December 22 || Dallas Stars || 4–2 || Columbus Blue Jackets || 9–21–5–1 || 24 || 
|- align="center" bgcolor="#ffbbbb"
|37 || December 27 || Columbus Blue Jackets || 1–5 || Detroit Red Wings || 9–22–5–1 || 24 || 
|- align="center" 
|38 || December 29 || Buffalo Sabres || 2–2 || Columbus Blue Jackets || 9–22–6–1 || 25 || 
|- align="center" bgcolor="#bbffbb"
|39 || December 31 || Mighty Ducks of Anaheim || 1–3 || Columbus Blue Jackets || 10–22–6–1 || 27 || 
|-

|- align="center" bgcolor="#ffbbbb"
|40 || January 3 || Columbus Blue Jackets || 2–4 || St. Louis Blues || 10–23–6–1 || 27 || 
|- align="center" bgcolor="#bbffbb"
|41 || January 6 || Nashville Predators || 3–4 || Columbus Blue Jackets || 11–23–6–1 || 29 || 
|- align="center" bgcolor="#ffbbbb"
|42 || January 9 || Columbus Blue Jackets || 3–6 || Washington Capitals || 11–24–6–1 || 29 || 
|- align="center" bgcolor="#ffbbbb"
|43 || January 10 || Columbus Blue Jackets || 1–2 || Chicago Blackhawks || 11–25–6–1 || 29 || 
|- align="center" bgcolor="#bbffbb"
|44 || January 12 || Chicago Blackhawks || 4–5 || Columbus Blue Jackets || 12–25–6–1 || 31 || 
|- align="center" 
|45 || January 14 || Columbus Blue Jackets || 2–2 || New York Rangers || 12–25–7–1 || 32 || 
|- align="center" bgcolor="#bbffbb"
|46 || January 16 || New York Rangers || 0–2 || Columbus Blue Jackets || 13–25–7–1 || 34 || 
|- align="center" bgcolor="#ffbbbb"
|47 || January 18 || Minnesota Wild || 3–1 || Columbus Blue Jackets || 13–26–7–1 || 34 || 
|- align="center" bgcolor="#ffbbbb"
|48 || January 19 || Columbus Blue Jackets || 1–2 || Nashville Predators || 13–27–7–1 || 34 || 
|- align="center" bgcolor="#ffbbbb"
|49 || January 21 || Dallas Stars || 5–3 || Columbus Blue Jackets || 13–28–7–1 || 34 || 
|- align="center" bgcolor="#bbffbb"
|50 || January 24 || San Jose Sharks || 2–6 || Columbus Blue Jackets || 14–28–7–1 || 36 || 
|- align="center" bgcolor="#ffbbbb"
|51 || January 26 || Phoenix Coyotes || 3–2 || Columbus Blue Jackets || 14–29–7–1 || 36 || 
|- align="center" bgcolor="#ffbbbb"
|52 || January 28 || Columbus Blue Jackets || 2–4 || Dallas Stars || 14–30–7–1 || 36 || 
|- align="center" bgcolor="#ffbbbb"
|53 || January 30 || Columbus Blue Jackets || 1–3 || Mighty Ducks of Anaheim || 14–31–7–1 || 36 || 
|-

|- align="center" bgcolor="#ffbbbb"
|54 || February 4 || Boston Bruins || 8–0 || Columbus Blue Jackets || 14–32–7–1 || 36 || 
|- align="center" bgcolor="#ffbbbb"
|55 || February 6 || Ottawa Senators || 6–4 || Columbus Blue Jackets || 14–33–7–1 || 36 || 
|- align="center" bgcolor="#bbffbb"
|56 || February 8 || Columbus Blue Jackets || 3–2 || Detroit Red Wings || 15–33–7–1 || 38 || 
|- align="center" bgcolor="#ffffbb"
|57 || February 9 || Nashville Predators || 1–0 || Columbus Blue Jackets || 15–33–7–2 || 39 || 
|- align="center" 
|58 || February 12 || Minnesota Wild || 3–3 || Columbus Blue Jackets || 15–33–8–2 || 40 || 
|- align="center" bgcolor="#ffbbbb"
|59 || February 26 || Los Angeles Kings || 5–1 || Columbus Blue Jackets || 15–34–8–2 || 40 || 
|- align="center" bgcolor="#ffffbb"
|60 || February 28 || Pittsburgh Penguins || 4–3 || Columbus Blue Jackets || 15–34–8–3 || 41 || 
|-

|- align="center" bgcolor="#bbffbb"
|61 || March 2 || Columbus Blue Jackets || 2–0 || Los Angeles Kings || 16–34–8–3 || 43 || 
|- align="center" bgcolor="#ffbbbb"
|62 || March 3 || Columbus Blue Jackets || 1–2 || Phoenix Coyotes || 16–35–8–3 || 43 || 
|- align="center" bgcolor="#ffbbbb"
|63 || March 6 || Columbus Blue Jackets || 1–4 || Colorado Avalanche || 16–36–8–3 || 43 || 
|- align="center" bgcolor="#bbffbb"
|64 || March 8 || New York Islanders || 2–4 || Columbus Blue Jackets || 17–36–8–3 || 45 || 
|- align="center" bgcolor="#ffbbbb"
|65 || March 10 || Columbus Blue Jackets || 0–5 || Minnesota Wild || 17–37–8–3 || 45 || 
|- align="center" bgcolor="#bbffbb"
|66 || March 11 || Columbus Blue Jackets || 4–2 || Pittsburgh Penguins || 18–37–8–3 || 47 || 
|- align="center" bgcolor="#ffbbbb"
|67 || March 14 || Vancouver Canucks || 5–1 || Columbus Blue Jackets || 18–38–8–3 || 47 || 
|- align="center" bgcolor="#bbffbb"
|68 || March 16 || Calgary Flames || 1–3 || Columbus Blue Jackets || 19–38–8–3 || 49 || 
|- align="center" bgcolor="#bbffbb"
|69 || March 20 || Columbus Blue Jackets || 3–1 || Minnesota Wild || 20–38–8–3 || 51 || 
|- align="center" bgcolor="#ffffbb" 
|70 || March 21 || Detroit Red Wings || 3–2 || Columbus Blue Jackets || 20–38–8–4 || 52 || 
|- align="center" bgcolor="#ffbbbb"
|71 || March 23 || Washington Capitals || 5–2 || Columbus Blue Jackets || 20–39–8–4 || 52 || 
|- align="center" bgcolor="#ffbbbb"
|72 || March 25 || Columbus Blue Jackets || 1–6 || Calgary Flames || 20–40–8–4 || 52 || 
|- align="center" bgcolor="#ffbbbb"
|73 || March 26 || Columbus Blue Jackets || 1–3 || Edmonton Oilers || 20–41–8–4 || 52 || 
|- align="center" bgcolor="#ffffbb"
|74 || March 28 || Columbus Blue Jackets || 3–4 || Vancouver Canucks || 20–41–8–5 || 53 || 
|- align="center" bgcolor="#ffbbbb"
|75 || March 30 || Columbus Blue Jackets || 2–10 || San Jose Sharks || 20–42–8–5 || 53 || 
|-

|- align="center" bgcolor="#ffbbbb"
|76 || April 1 || Columbus Blue Jackets || 1–3 || Dallas Stars || 20–43–8–5 || 53 || 
|- align="center" bgcolor="#bbffbb"
|77 || April 4 || Nashville Predators || 1–2 || Columbus Blue Jackets || 21–43–8–5 || 55 || 
|- align="center" bgcolor="#ffbbbb"
|78 || April 6 || Columbus Blue Jackets || 1–4 || Montreal Canadiens || 21–44–8–5 || 55 || 
|- align="center" bgcolor="#ffbbbb"
|79 || April 8 || Columbus Blue Jackets || 1–4 || Toronto Maple Leafs || 21–45–8–5 || 55 || 
|- align="center" bgcolor="#ffbbbb"
|80 || April 10 || San Jose Sharks || 5–3 || Columbus Blue Jackets || 21–46–8–5 || 55 || 
|- align="center" bgcolor="#bbffbb"
|81 || April 12 || Atlanta Thrashers || 4–5 || Columbus Blue Jackets || 22–46–8–5 || 57 || 
|- align="center" bgcolor="#ffbbbb"
|82 || April 14 || Columbus Blue Jackets || 0–2 || Chicago Blackhawks || 22–47–8–5 || 57 || 
|-

|-
| Legend:

Player statistics

Scoring
 Position abbreviations: C = Center; D = Defense; G = Goaltender; LW = Left Wing; RW = Right Wing
  = Joined team via a transaction (e.g., trade, waivers, signing) during the season. Stats reflect time with the Blue Jackets only.
  = Left team via a transaction (e.g., trade, waivers, release) during the season. Stats reflect time with the Blue Jackets only.

Goaltending

Transactions
The Blue Jackets were involved in the following transactions from June 10, 2001, the day after the deciding game of the 2001 Stanley Cup Finals, through June 13, 2002, the day of the deciding game of the 2002 Stanley Cup Finals.

Trades

Players acquired

Players lost

Signings

Draft picks
Columubus' draft picks at the 2001 NHL Entry Draft.

Notes

References

Columbus
Columbus Blue Jackets seasons
Col
Blue
Blue